Bereke may refer to:

 Berke, Mongol ruler
 Bereke, Kazakhstan
 Bereke, Bor